Baku Tower is a skyscraper in Baku, Azerbaijan. Construction started in 2014, and ended in 2020. Baku Tower is primarily used for office space. The address of Baku Tower is 109 Heydar Aliyev Avenue. The building is made out of reinforced concrete and steel.

General 

The Baku Tower  is currently a tallest skyscraper in Azerbaijan.
Architect Eren Yorulmazer / Mazeron Design Studio

References 

Buildings and structures in Baku
Skyscrapers in Azerbaijan